The 1982 Havering Council election took place on 6 May 1982 to elect members of Havering London Borough Council in London, England. The whole council was up for election and the Conservative party stayed in overall control of the council.

Background

The 1982 local elections included all London boroughs, several English boroughs and a handful of Scottish regional elections. The previous London Borough elections were in 1978.

Election result
Havering London Borough is formed of three parliamentary constituencies: Hornchurch, Romford and Upminster.  The Conservative party received the highest proportion of votes across all three boroughs, retaining overall control of the council.

Ward results
There were 25 wards within Havering Borough, all of which held an election. Fourteen wards elected a Conservative party candidate, four a Labour party candidate, two a Liberal and Social Democratic Party Alliance candidate, two a candidate from the Residents' Association, two an Independent Ratepayer, and one a candidate from the Ratepayer's Association.

References

1982
1982 London Borough council elections
May 1982 events in the United Kingdom